The Fourth Inspectorate-General (Dördüncü Umumi Müffetişlik) refers to a regional administrative subdivision in the Dersim region.

History 
The Fourth Inspectorate-General  (Umumi Müfettişlik, UM) was based on the Law 1164 from September 1927, which was passed in order to Turkefy the non-Turkish population. Before, there were established three other Inspectorates-General in other areas. The first in Kurdish provinces in the southeast of Anatolia, the second in Thracia in the northwestern part of Turkey, and another one in the northeastern part of Turkey. Following the Tunceli Law of December 1935, which demanded a more powerful government in the region, and also classified the Dersim district from the Elazığ province into a province named Tunceli, the fourth Inspectorate-General was created in January 1936. The fourth UM span over the provinces of Elazığ, Erzincan, Bingöl and Tunceli. The focus of the UM was on Tunceli but its seat was in Elazığ which with its Turkish majority population and infrastructure of railroads and telephone lines to the Turkish capital would serve its purpose well. It was governed by a Governor-Commander in a state of emergency. Most of the employees in the municipality were to be filled with military personnel and the Governor-Commander had the authority to evacuate whole villages and resettle them in other parts of the country. Also the juridical guarantees did not comply with the law valid in other parts of Turkey. The trials were at most five days long and sentences could not be appealed. For a release, the Governor Commander had to give his consent. The application of the death penalty was under the authority of the Governor-Commander, while normally it would be the authority of the Grand National Assembly of Turkey to approve such a punishment. The laws did not only apply for the Dersim region, but if the authorities argued the fellony had a relation to the Dersim question, it applied also to other regions. Therefore people from Dersim were under surveillance at all times, even if they were exiled out of Dersim to western Turkey. Following its establishment, to gain more control over the region; military quarters, police stations, schools and also a railway track to Elazığ were built. Seyid Riza, a local tribal chief from Dersim, demanded the Tunceli Law to be revoked and tribesmen loyal to him attacked a police station in March 1937 which sparked a strong response from the Turkish Government. The Dersim rebellion was suppressed with utmost determination, massacres of the local population were executed and its leaders were hanged. Abdullah Alpdoğan supported the idea, the Kurdish identity would be toppled by telling the Kurds just enough that they were Turks, and stayed in the post of the Governor-Commander until 1943.

Education 
In 1937 the Elazığ Girls’ Institute was inaugurated where “savage“ Kurdish girls were supposed to become civilized Turkish young women. The institute was lead for the most time of its existence by Sıdıka Avar.

Disestablishment 
In 1946 the Tunceli Law was abolished and the state of emergency removed but the authority of the fourth UM was transferred to the military. In 1948 the administrative posts of the UM were not to be reoccupied but the legal possibility of their creation was kept. By 1950 a discussion about the UMs had begun by several members of the Grand National Assembly of Turkey. Remzi Bucak from Diyarbakır, criticized the UM and compared it to the British colonization practices in India. The Inspectorates-Generals were eventually dissolved in 1952 during the Government of the Democrat Party who had a different approach to the Kurdish question.

References 

History of Erzincan Province
History of Tunceli Province
History of Bingöl Province
History of Elazığ Province
Dersim rebellion
Former subdivisions of Turkey
Cultural assimilation